Vilabertran (1913) is a painting by the Spanish surrealist artist Salvador Dalí. This is among Dalí's earliest works, having been painted when he was about nine years old. It is a landscape painting from Vilabertran, which and where Dalí often drew in his early period.

1913 paintings
Paintings by Salvador Dalí